Novaya Dolina is a rural locality (a settlement) in Volokonovsky District, Belgorod Oblast, Russia. The population was 50 as of 2010. There is 1 street.

Geography 
Novaya Dolina is located 25 km northwest of Volokonovka (the district's administrative centre) by road. Otradnoye is the nearest rural locality.

References 

Rural localities in Volokonovsky District